The 2016 FIM CEV Moto2 European Championship was the seventh CEV Moto2 season and the second under the FIM banner. The season was held over 11 races at 7 meetings, beginning on 17 April at Valencia and finishing on 20 November at the same venue.

Calendar

Entry list

Championship standings

External links
 

FIM CEV Moto2 European Championship
2016 in motorcycle sport
2016 in Spanish motorsport